Caroline Kamya (born 1974) is a British Ugandan film director and producer.

Early life 
Kamya was born and raised in Uganda, Kenya and the U.K,

Education 
Kamya has a BSc in architecture and urban design and an MA in TV documentary from Goldsmiths College.

Career 
Kamya has won over 10 awards internationally and has worked in television in London before setting up a production house in Kampala, IVAD International.

Kamya's debut feature film, Imani (2010), opened at the 2010 Berlin Film Festival, where it was nominated for Best First Feature. Chips and Liver Girls, codirected with Danish director Boris Bertram in 2010, was a short film about young Ugandan women and "the men who pay for their studies". The short film Fire Fly (2011) was shot in China.

Filmography

 Chips and Liver Girls (short), 2011
 Imani, 2010
 Fire Fly (short), 2011
 The Peace Between 2019

References

External links
 Personal website

1974 births
Living people
Ugandan film directors
Ugandan women film directors